Limnaecia melanosoma is a moth in the family Cosmopterigidae. It is found in Australia, where it has been described from Victoria.

References

Natural History Museum Lepidoptera generic names catalog

Limnaecia
Moths of Australia
Moths described in 1897